Youth League may refer to any of the following

Organizations

 Youth Leagues (Ceylon),  societies of young people, mainly intellectuals, who wanted independence for Sri Lanka
 A-League National Youth League, an Australian national football (soccer) league
 African National Congress Youth League, the youth wing of the African National Congress
 City Youth League, a defunct organization that participated in nonviolent resistance against the government in Rhodesia
 Coalition Party Youth League, the youth wing of National Coalition Party in Finland
 Communist Youth League of China also known as the China Youth League, a youth movement of the People's Republic of China
 ESC Youth League, a shooting competition for national teams created by the European Shooting Confederation
 General Dutch Youth League, a political youth movement in the Netherlands
 Gilette National Youth League, a British rugby league tournament at under-18 level
 Kuomintang Youth League, is a youth group under the Kuomintang
 Left Communist Youth League, the youth organization of the Norwegian Labour Party
 Moderate Youth League, the youth wing of the Swedish Moderate Party
 Muslim Youth League, the youth wing of the Indian Union Muslim League
 National Soccer Youth League, also known as the National Youth League, an Australian national football (soccer) league
 Patriotic Youth League, a youth organisation in Australia
 Radical Youth League, is a frontal organization of the Communist Party of India (Maoist), a Naxalite group in India
 Revolutionary Youth League (Finland), a political youth organization in Finland during the 1980s
 Socialist Youth League of Norway, the youth wing of the Social Democratic Labour Party of Norway
 Socialist Youth League (Sweden),  the youth organization of the Swedish Socialist Party
 Somali Youth League, the first political party in Somalia
 SWAPO Party Youth League, the youth wing of the South West Africa People's Organization
 Swedish Social Democratic Youth League,  a branch of the Swedish social democratic party
 UEFA Youth League, a European football competition at under-19 level
 West African Youth League, a political organisation founded by I. T. A. Wallace-Johnson in June 1935
 Workers' Youth League (Norway), Norway's biggest political youth organization, affiliated with the Norwegian Labour Party 
 Workers' Youth League (Sweden), the youth organization of the Communist Party of Sweden
 League of Youth, the youth organisation of the British Labour Party from 1926 to the 1960s

Other

 The League of Youth, a play by Henrik Ibsen finished in early May 1869

See also
 National Youth League (disambiguation)
 Socialist Youth League (disambiguation)
 Workers' Youth League (disambiguation)